Sara Blicavs (born 15 February 1993) is an Australian professional basketball player. She currently plays for the Southside Flyers in the WNBL

Blicavs was a member of the Australian Women's basketball team (Opals) at the 2020 Tokyo Olympics. The Opals were eliminated after losing to the USA in the quarterfinals.

Career
Blicavs plays in the guard or forward positions.

WNBL
Blicavs began her career, playing for the Australian Institute of Sport. After a brief stint with the Dandenong Rangers, Blicavs moved to the Bendigo Spirit. There, she won her first WNBL championship. For the 2015–16 WNBL season, Blicavs returned to the Dandenong Rangers. Blicavs has been re-signed for a third season with the Rangers.

National team

Youth level
Blicavs made her international debut with the Under-17 program at the FIBA Oceania Under-16 Championship in 2009. She would then go on to represent Australia at the FIBA Under-17 World Championship in France, where Australia placed seventh. She would then go on to represent the Gems at the FIBA Under-19 World Championship in Chile, where Australia narrowly missed out on bronze, placing fourth.

Senior level
Blicavs made her debut with the Opals at the 2015 FIBA Oceania Championship, where Australia took home Gold and qualified for the 2016 Summer Olympics. She also participated in the Olympic Test Event in Rio de Janeiro, in January 2016.

Blicavs, like all the other members of the 2020 Tokyo Olympics Opals women's basketball team, had a difficult tournament. The Opals lost their first two group stage matches. They looked flat against Belgium and then lost to China in heartbreaking circumstances. In their last group match the Opals needed to beat Puerto Rico by 25 or more in their final match to progress. This they did by 27 in a very exciting match. However, they lost to the United States in their quarterfinal 79 to 55.

Personal life
Blicavs is from Victoria, Australia. She is of Latvian descent through her father and Jersey (Channel Islands) descent through her mother. Her parents, Andris Blicavs and Karen Blicavs, both played for Australian national basketball teams, and her brother Mark plays for the Geelong Football Club. Her parents' careers in basketball both ended because of knee injuries.

See also

Blicavs

References

1993 births
Australian women's basketball players
Forwards (basketball)
Sportswomen from Victoria (Australia)
Australian people of Latvian descent
Australian people of Jersey descent
Australian Institute of Sport basketball (WNBL) players
Living people
Universiade medalists in basketball
Universiade bronze medalists for Australia
Medalists at the 2013 Summer Universiade
Basketball players at the 2020 Summer Olympics
Olympic basketball players of Australia
Basketball players from Melbourne
People from Sunbury, Victoria